The 1993 Canadian Senior Curling Championships, Canada's national championship for curlers over 50, were held March 13 to 20, 1993 at the Ottewell Curling Club in Edmonton, Alberta. 

Team Alberta, consisting of Len Erickson, Merl Brown, Bernie Desjarlais and Nelson Caron from the host Ottewell Club won the men's event, defeating the Northwest Territories/Yukon rink, skipped by Al Demage 8–4 in the final. It was the first Canadian Senior Championship for an Edmonton rink, and the third men's championship for Alberta.

Team Ontario, consisting of Jill Greenwood, Yvonne Smith, Victoria Lauder and Maymar Gemmell from Mississauga won the women's event, 6–4 over Manitoba's Joan Ingram rink. Greenwood made a six-foot double-raise takeout "circus shot" on her final stone of the game to win her second national seniors title.

Men's

Standings
Final round-robin standings.

Playoffs

Semifinal
March 19, 8:00pm

Final
March 20, 2:00pm

Women's

Standings
Final round-robin standings.

Playoffs

Semifinal
March 19, 8:00pm

Final 
March 20, 2:00pm

References
 

1993 in Canadian curling
Canadian Senior Curling Championships
1993 in Alberta
Curling competitions in Edmonton
March 1993 sports events in Canada
1990s in Edmonton